Greatest Hits is a compilation album by English reggae group UB40, released in 2008. The album includes all 21 tracks from 11 studio albums and the compilation The Best of UB40: Volume Two.

Reception 

David Jeffries from AllMusic says the two sides of UB40's career is represented in Greatest Hits from "the ultra-slick, easy to swallow side of the band" with tracks like "(I Can't Help) Falling in Love with You" mixed in with "the underdog with roots reggae attitude and dubby production" numbers like "One in Ten". He calls it a "one-disc, nonjudgmental document of UB40 done right."

Track listing

Personnel 
 Ali Campbell - guitar, vocals
 Mickey Virtue - keyboards
 Astro - percussion, trumpet, vocals
 Jimmy Brown - drums 
 Robin Campbell - guitar, vocals
 Earl Falconer - bass guitar 
 Brian Travers - saxophone 
 Chrissie Hynde - Vocals (I Got You, Babe and Breakfast In Bed)
Production 
 Dan Armstrong - Producer
 Danny Canaan - Producer
 Frank Collura - Compilation Producer
 Ray Falconer - Producer
 Howard Gray - Producer
 Susan Lavoie - Art Direction 
 Sam Nelson - Compilation Producer
 Gerry Parchment - Producer
 Will Ragland - Design 
 Charlie Skarbek - Producer

Release history

References 

UB40 compilation albums
2008 greatest hits albums
Virgin Records compilation albums